Michael Vernon Townley (born December 5, 1942, in Waterloo, Iowa) is an American-born former agent of the Dirección de Inteligencia Nacional (DINA), the secret police of Chile during the regime of Augusto Pinochet. In 1978, Townley pled guilty to the 1976 murders of Orlando Letelier, former Chilean ambassador to the United States, and Ronni Karpen Moffitt, Letelier's co-worker at the Institute for Policy Studies. He was sentenced to ten years in prison, serving 62 months. As part of his plea bargain, Townley received immunity from further prosecution; he was not extradited to Argentina to stand trial for the 1974 assassination of Chilean General Carlos Prats and his wife in Buenos Aires.

In 1993, Townley was also convicted in absentia by an Italian court of carrying out the 1975 Rome murder attempt on Bernardo Leighton. Townley worked in producing chemical weapons for Pinochet's use against political opponents along with Colonel Gerardo Huber and the DINA biochemist Eugenio Berríos.

Early life
In 1957, Townley moved to Chile with his father, Vernon Townley, who became head of the Ford Motor Company in Chile. He worked as a salesman of mutual fund stocks. In 1967, he moved to Miami with his family and worked as a mechanic in Miami's Little Havana, where he became friends with anti-Castro exiles.

In 1970, Townley moved his family back to Chile. Townley later testified that, before leaving the US, he contacted the CIA to offer his services in Chile, however Townley said he never worked for the CIA. Back in Chile, Townley ran a clandestine anti-Allende radio station and worked with violent opposition groups. He fled Chile in the months before the 1973 coup which overthrew Allende. Townley then returned to Chile and was recruited by the DINA.

1974 assassination of Carlos Prats 

Michael Townley was responsible for the assassination of General Carlos Prats, who served as a minister in Salvador Allende's government while Commander-in-chief of the Chilean Army. Immediately after the 1973 coup, Prats went into exile in Argentina.

DINA chief Manuel Contreras tasked Townley with the assassination of Prats. Townley spent three weeks in Buenos Aires monitoring Prats and planning. On September 30, 1974, Prats and his wife Sofia were killed outside their apartment in Buenos Aires by a radio-controlled car bomb. Debris reached the ninth-floor balcony of the building across the street.

1975 Bernardo Leighton assassination attempt

Townley was convicted and sentenced in absentia in Italy to a 15-year prison sentence over his role as an intermediary between the DINA and Italian neo-fascist terrorist organizations, including Avanguardia Nazionale.

Michael Townley also stated that Enrique Arancibia had traveled to California in the autumn of 1977 on banking business for ALFA, alias Stefano Delle Chiaie. Enrique Arancibia is a former DINA agent who resided in unofficial exile in Buenos Aires after the assassination of Chilean Army Chief of Staff René Schneider on October 25, 1970. Arancibia was arrested by Argentine intelligence officers shortly after the extradition of Townley to the US and charged with espionage.

Convicted for Orlando Letelier's murder 

Townley was convicted in the United States of the 1976 murder of Orlando Letelier in Washington, D.C. During his trial, he said that Pinochet was responsible for planning the murder. Manuel Contreras, head of the DINA, also stated that Pinochet planned the assassination of both Prats and Letelier. Townley served 62 months in prison for the murder.

Townley confessed that he had hired five anti-Castro Cuban exiles to booby-trap Letelier's car. According to Jean-Guy Allard, after consultations with the leadership of the anti-Castro Cuban organization Coordinación de Organizaciones Revolutionarias Unidas (CORU), including Luis Posada Carriles and Orlando Bosch, those chosen to carry out the murder were Cuban-Americans José Dionisio Suárez, Virgilio Paz Romero, Alvin Ross Díaz, and brothers Guillermo and Ignacio Novo Sampol. According to the Miami Herald, Luis Posada Carriles was also at this meeting, which decided on Letelier's death and also about the Cubana Flight 455 bombing. Townley was the prosecution's chief witness at the trial for Ross and the Novo brothers.

In 1978, Chile agreed to extradite Townley to the United States, in order to reduce the tension resulting from Orlando Letelier's murder. He made an agreement with the US government on April 17, 1978, which required that he only provide information relevant to violations of US law or offenses committed in US jurisdiction. Based on that argument, he refused to provide any information concerning DINA during the trial of the three Cuban defendants in Washington, D.C. in early 1979 concerning Letelier's assassination. Townley was then freed under an unofficial Witness Protection Program. The United States is still waiting for Pedro Espinoza Bravo, a former Chilean military and DINA operative also involved in the assassination of Letelier, to be extradited. DINA chief Manuel Contreras died in Santiago in 2015, without having been extradited.

In an interview with authorities on October 20, 1981, Townley declared that Castro opponent Virgilio Paz Romero brought with him a Colt .45 caliber automatic pistol when he visited Chile in the spring of 1976. According to Townley, Romero said that the weapon had recently been used in a "hit" by the Cuban Nationalist Movement and that his purpose in Chile was to use it again. Townley then said that Romero had broken the weapon in pieces and scattered the pieces throughout Santiago.

In 2005, DINA chief Manuel Contreras also told the Chilean judge responsible for trying the case that Townley had been supported for Letelier's assassination by CIA agents, as well as the Cuban Nationalist Movement and members of the Venezuela's National Directorate of Intelligence and Prevention Services (DISIP), for which Luis Posada Carriles worked. General Vernon Walters, CIA deputy director from 1972 to 1976, informed Pinochet that Letelier represented a threat to the US and was preparing a Chilean government in exile, according to Contreras. Contreras wrote in the document that "the Chilean President disposed in personal, exclusive and direct manner of the action of CIA agent Michael Townley against Mr. Orlando Letelier".

Contreras also stated that Chile's National Information Center (CNI) handed out monthly payments between 1978 and 1990 to the persons who had worked with Townley in Chile, all members of Patria y Libertad: Mariana Callejas (Townley's wife), Francisco Oyarzún, Gustavo Etchepare and Eugenio Berríos. Assassinated in 1995, Berríos worked with drug traffickers and DEA agents.

In December 2016, a Chilean court ruled that both Townley and former Chilean Major General Armando Fernandez Larios could be tried in Chile for these murders.

Ongoing investigations
In 2003, Argentine Federal Judge María Servini de Cubría asked Chile for the extradition of Townley's wife Mariana Callejas, who was accused of involvement in Carlos Prats' murder. But, in July 2005, Chilean judge Nibaldo Segura of the Court of Appeals stated that the case cannot proceed, arguing that Callejas was already being tried in Chile.

Questioned in March 2005 by Judge Alejandro Madrid about former Chilean Christian Democrat President Eduardo Frei Montalva's death, Michael Townley acknowledged links between Colonia Dignidad, led by Paul Schäfer and DINA on one side and the Laboratorio de Guerra Bacteriológica del Ejército (Bacteriological Warfare Laboratory of the Army) on the other. It is suspected the toxin that killed Frei Montalva in a Santa Maria clinic in 1982 was created there. This new laboratory in Colonia Dignidad would have been, according to him, the continuation of the laboratory the DINA had in Via Naranja de lo Curro where he worked with DINA biochemist Eugenio Berríos. Townley would also have testified on biological experiments made upon prisoners in Colonia Dignidad with the help of the two above mentioned laboratories.

In 1992, Townley testified that the Spanish diplomat Carmelo Soria, assassinated in 1976, had been detained at his home on Via Naranja in the sector of Lo Curro. There he was tortured and, since he did not speak, subjected to sarin (which had been made by Berríos).  Soria was then detained and tortured again in the Villa Grimaldi and his case was included in Spanish magistrate Baltasar Garzon's indictment of Pinochet. In May 2016, Chile's Supreme Court asked the United States to extradite Chilean Armando Fernandez Larios, Townley and Cuban Virgilio Paz, all three of whom were linked to the September 21, 1976, car-bombing murders in Washington, D.C. In November 2002, Soria's widow, Laura Gonzalez-Vera, along with the personal representative of Soria's estate, sued Townley seeking damages for Soria's torture and killing. When Townley defaulted, the district court entered a $7 million judgment against him. The Supreme Court unanimously ruled that the foreign ministry of Chile should file an extradition request to the United States for Michael Townley and Armando Fernandez Larios.

In May 2016, the Supreme Court of Chile asked for the extradition of Townley, Virgilio, and Armando Fernandez Larios for their alleged roles in the murder of Soria in 1976.  Townley remained in the U.S. Witness Protection Program and his whereabouts is unknown.

Alleged role in Pablo Neruda's death
In 2011, an investigation was launched into the death of Pablo Neruda, partially on the strength of a statement from his driver that he was injected with a poison by a Dr. Price. Price's description matched that of Townley, and police examined this link while Neruda's body was exhumed and tested for possible toxins. On 8 November 2013, the test results were released, with head of Chile's medical legal service Patricio Bustos stating that "No relevant chemical substances have been found that could be linked to Mr. Neruda's death". However, Carroza said that he is waiting for the results of the last scientific test conducted in May 2015, which found that Neruda was infected with the Staphylococcus aureus bacterium, which can be highly toxic and result in death if modified. The Chilean government suggested in 2015 that it was "highly probable that a third party" was responsible for Neruda's death, and a forensics test taken through samples of Neruda's remains in 2017 rejected Neruda's "official cause of death," which had been listed as prostate cancer. However, scientists who exhumed Neruda's body in 2013 had backed claims that he was suffering from prostate cancer. It was also acknowledged that Neruda's driver was the one who claimed he was poisoned.

In Literature

In Roberto Bolaño's novel By Night in Chile (2000), the character Jimmy Thompson, an American who has been deputized by the Chilean secret police to torture opponents of the regime, is based on Michael Townley.

References

External links 
 National Security Archives - CIA declassified documents

1942 births
American people of Chilean descent
Chilean anti-communists
American anti-communists
1976 murders in the United States
American people convicted of murder
People of the Dirección de Inteligencia Nacional
Dirty wars
People who entered the United States Federal Witness Protection Program
People convicted of murder by the United States federal government
American expatriates in Chile
Living people
People convicted in absentia
American assassins
People from Waterloo, Iowa
1993 crimes in Italy
Operation Condor
Members of Fatherland and Liberty
1974 murders in Argentina
1975 murders in Italy